Kozhlya is a rural locality in Makarovsky Selsoviet Rural Settlement, Kurchatovsky District, Kursk Oblast, Russia. Population:

Geography 
The village is located 63.5 km from the Russia–Ukraine border, 43.5 km west of Kursk, 11 km north-west of the district center – the town Kurchatov, 5 km from the selsoviet center – Makarovka.

 Climate
Kozhlya has a warm-summer humid continental climate (Dfb in the Köppen climate classification).

Transport 
Kozhlya is located 35.5 km from the federal route  Crimea Highway, 9.5 km from the road of regional importance  (Kursk – Lgov – Rylsk – border with Ukraine), 0.5 km from the road of intermunicipal significance  (38K-017 – Nikolayevka – Shirkovo), 10 km from the nearest railway station Lukashevka (railway line Lgov I — Kursk).

The rural locality is situated 50 km from Kursk Vostochny Airport, 140 km from Belgorod International Airport and 254 km from Voronezh Peter the Great Airport.

References

Notes

Sources

Rural localities in Kurchatovsky District, Kursk Oblast
Lgovsky Uyezd